Christ's Church, Fuyang District, locally known as Sigong Christian Church, is a Protestant church located in Fuyang District, Hangzhou, Zhejiang, China.

History 
The church was built by the Anglicanism in 1910.

Gallery

References

Further reading 
 

Churches in Hangzhou
1910 establishments in China
Churches completed in 1910
Tourist attractions in Hangzhou
Protestant churches in China